Jalebi (also known as Jalebi: The Everlasting Taste of Love) is a 2018 Indian Hindi-language musical romantic drama film directed by Pushpdeep Bhardwaj. It's an official remake of the Bengali film Praktan (2016) and stars Rhea Chakraborty, debutant Varun Mitra and Digangana Suryavanshi in lead roles.

Plot
Aisha (Rhea Chakraborty) is a budding writer and an independent, progressive woman from Mumbai who visits Delhi with her friend to research for her upcoming book. She meets a local guide, Dev (Varun Mitra) and falls in love with him. She later proposes to him and they get married. After a few months, Aisha learns that she is pregnant. Dev is extremely happy but Aisha is reluctant as she feels she isn't ready for motherhood. Dev convinces her and they both settle into happiness, feeling that they might have a baby girl whom they will name Disha, a portmanteau of Dev and Aisha's names.

Unfortunately, Aisha has a miscarriage and Dev's mother blames Aisha for it. Aisha feels humiliated and insulted and leaves Dev. A few days later, Dev and his family try to bring her back but she doesn't return. She asks Dev to meet her in Kashmir if he really loves her, but Dev does not come.

Seven years later, Aisha calls off her second wedding as she is still in love with Dev. She decides to face her problems and travels to Delhi. On her way, she meets a woman named Anu and her daughter, Pulti, and discovers that Anu is Dev's second wife. She also meets Dev in the same train. During the journey, she reminisces about her marriage with him. She also finds out that Pulti's given name is Disha, and feels upset, chiding Dev for naming her that. Anu reveals that Pulti is not Dev's child and was sired by Anu's boyfriend. Dev lifted at the very next moment he saw Pulti and before marriage he had a single condition that she should be named Disha.

The train reaches Dev's station. While leaving, Anu thanks Aisha for giving her Dev and tells her that she knows that Aisha is Dev's love and first wife. Dev disembarks the train, but Anu encourages Dev to reveal the truth to Aisha that he had come to meet her that day in Kashmir but realised that she wouldn't be happy with him. His world is different from hers and he wanted to see her living her life happily and fulfilling her dreams. He reveals that it was because of this that he hurried through their divorce proceedings, and appeared as a bad person before her. He also tells her that he had read her novel many times. Both cry and hug each other. She says that although their destinations are different, their love remains intact. Dev tells Aisha that he will wait for her next novel, and they part ways, to live two different lives and two different destinies.

A year later, Dev finds Aisha's new book named Jalebi, which is an account of their love story.

Cast
 Rhea  Chakraborty as Aisha Pradhan, Dev's first wife
 Varun Mitra as Dev Mathur, Aisha's ex-husband and Anu's husband
 Digangana Suryavanshi as Anu Mathur, Dev's second wife
 Aanya Dureja as Disha 'Pulti' Mathur, Dev's adoptive daughter 
 Poorti Arya as Renu Mathur, Dev's sister
 Pravina Deshpande as Kamla Mathur, Dev's mother
 Mahesh Thakur as Mr. Pradhan, Aisha's father
 Priya Yadav as Anaina, Aisha's friend
 Sonali Sudan as Mrs. Singh
 Jashn Kohli as Sunny Singh
 Shabnam Kapoor as Mrs. Singh's Mother
 Farida Dadi as old passenger in train
 Yusuf Hussain as old passenger in train
 Arjun Kanungo as himself
 Sanchay Goswami as Arjun's friend
 Chayan Trivedi as T.T.E
 Abhishek Khanna as J.P. Mishra, Coach Attendant

Marketing
The first look of the movie was released on 3 September 2018.

The poster in which the lead pair is seen engaged in a passionate kiss through the window of a train is a clear reflection of the 1950 photograph by Frank Brown. The iconic photograph basically symbolised the distress wrought by the Korean War.

The official trailer for the film was released on 10 September 2018.

Soundtrack 

The film's soundtrack was released on 21 September 2018. Jeet Gannguli, Tanishk Bagchi, Javed-Mohsin, Abhishek Mishra and Samuel–Akanksha composed the soundtrack of the film. Music Produced By Dj Phukan, Samuel Shetty & Akanksha Nandrekar, Chandan Saxena, Krishna Kishore. The lyrics are written by Rashmi Virag, Prashant Ingole, Manoj Kumarnath, Arafat Mehmood and Kunaal Vermaa.

References

External links
  
 

2018 films
2010s Hindi-language films
Films about music and musicians
2018 romantic drama films
2010s romantic musical films
2010s musical drama films
Indian romantic musical films
Indian musical drama films
Indian romantic drama films
Viacom18 Studios films
Hindi remakes of Bengali films